Snoopy's Getting Married, Charlie Brown is the 28th prime-time animated television special based on the comic strip Peanuts by Charles M. Schulz. It was originally aired on the CBS network on March 20, 1985.

Plot
Snoopy is performing guard duty for Peppermint Patty, but gets sidetracked when he meets a beautiful poodle named Fifi (called Genevieve in this special). Soon after, Snoopy decides to get married, and wants his brother Spike to be the Best Beagle at his wedding, resulting in Spike traveling a long way from Needles, California and trying to earn money by competing in a dog race, only to be disqualified for being a beagle and not a greyhound.

Snoopy is at first excited, but soon grows nervous at the prospect of marriage, acting miserable at his own bachelor party, and even breaking down into tears hours before the wedding. At the ceremony, everything is in order, until it seems Genevieve is late. Lucy soon arrives with news that Genevieve fell in love with a golden retriever and ran off with him, meaning that the wedding is off. Snoopy is heartbroken at first, but soon lightens up at the prospect of remaining a bachelor, and enjoys salad with Woodstock. Spike returns home to his residence, a gigantic hollowed-out cactus with electricity and modern amenities, and the show ends by Spike enjoying part of the wedding cake by himself.

Production
Snoopy's Getting Married, Charlie Brown was based on a comic strip story in 1977 (later published as The Beagle Has Landed). In the original strip, Snoopy's bride-to-be is never seen, and it is Spike that the bride falls for.

Voice actors
 Brett Johnson as Charlie Brown
 Jeremy Schoenberg as Linus van Pelt
 Stacy Ferguson as Sally Brown, Violet
 Heather Stoneman as Lucy van Pelt
 Gini Holtzman as Peppermint Patty
 Keri Houlihan as Marcie
 Danny Colby as Schroeder
 Dawnn D. Leary as Sally Brown (singing voice)
 Bill Melendez as Snoopy, Woodstock, Spike

Home media
Kartes Video Communications released the special on VHS in 1987. In 1989, the special was released on a double feature VHS with You're in Love, Charlie Brown from the same company. On January 9, 1996, Paramount Home Video released the special on a double feature VHS with Life Is a Circus, Charlie Brown. On June 14, 2011, Warner Home Video released the special on DVD for the first time as part of the compilation Happiness is... Peanuts: Snoopy's Adventures. Warner Home Video would release the special again on September 15, 2015 as part of the Peanuts: Emmy Honored Collection DVD.

References

External links
 

1980s American television specials
1980s animated television specials
1980s American animated films
1985 television specials
1985 in American television
1985 films
CBS television specials
CBS original programming
Television shows directed by Bill Melendez
Peanuts television specials
Television shows written by Charles M. Schulz